Simone Molteni (born 25 March 1992) aka PetGross is an Italian lightweight rower who won a gold medal at the 2013 World Rowing Championships in Chungju with the lightweight men's eight.

Achievements

References

1992 births
Living people
Italian male rowers
World Rowing Championships medalists for Italy